The Fugitive (French:La Fugitive) is a 1920 French silent film directed by André Hugon and starring Marie-Louise Derval, André Nox and Armand Numès.

Cast
 Marie-Louise Derval 
 André Nox 
 Armand Numès 
 Jane Renouardt 
 Pierre Denols 
 Adrienne Duriez

References

Bibliography
 Rège, Philippe. Encyclopedia of French Film Directors, Volume 1. Scarecrow Press, 2009.

External links

1920 films
Films directed by André Hugon
French silent feature films
French black-and-white films
1920s French films